Ahmet Can Duran (born January 28, 1999) is a Turkish professional basketball player for Fenerbahçe Koleji of the Turkish Turkish Basketball Second League (TB2L).

Early career
Duran began playing with the youth teams of the Turkish club Fenerbahçe in 2014.

Professional career
After playing with the junior teams of Fenerbahçe, Duran began his pro career in 2016, with the senior men's team of Fenerbahçe.

On August 23, 2020, he has signed with Büyükçekmece Basketbol of the Turkish Basketbol Süper Ligi (BSL).

Turkish national team
With the junior national teams of Turkey, Duran played at the 2014 FIBA Europe Under-16 Championship, and at the 2015 FIBA Europe Under-16 Championship, where he won a bronze medal and was a member of the All-Tournament Team. He also won the silver medal at the 2016 FIBA Under-17 World Championship. He also played at the 2016 FIBA Europe Under-18 Championship.

References

External links
 Ahmet Can Duran at draftexpress.com
 Ahmet Can Duran at eurobasket.com
 Ahmet Can Duran at euroleague.net
 Ahmet Can Duran at fenerbahce.org
 Ahmet Can Duran at fiba.com (archive)
 Ahmet Can Duran at scoutbasketball.com
 Ahmet Can Duran at tblstat.net

1999 births
Living people
Büyükçekmece Basketbol players
Centers (basketball)
Fenerbahçe men's basketball players
People from Afyonkarahisar
Turkish men's basketball players
21st-century Turkish people